May el-Thouky (born 17 August 1977 in Charlottenlund, Denmark) is a Danish-Egyptian film director. She graduated from the Danish National School of Performing Arts in 2002, and later as a film director from the National Film School of Denmark in 2009.

She is known for directing the 2019 film Queen of Hearts. She also directed the 2015 film Long Story Short.

Filmography
 Long Story Short (2015)
 Queen of Hearts (2019)
 The Crown (2 Episodes of Season 5)

References

External links
 

Danish film directors
1977 births
Living people
Danish people of Egyptian descent
People from Copenhagen